Hampden Park in Glasgow is the primary home stadium for the Scotland national football team. This has been the case since 1906, soon after it opened. The present site of Hampden Park is the third location to bear that name and both the previous locations also hosted Scotland games. Scotland have also played many of their home games in other stadiums throughout their history, both in friendly matches and for competitive tournaments.

History

Early history
Scotland hosted the first official international match, a goalless draw against England on 30 November 1872, at the Hamilton Crescent cricket ground in Glasgow. This venue was used for four Scotland matches between then and 1876. The next venue to be used was the first Hampden Park, home of Queen's Park. It hosted the first ever Scottish Cup Final in 1874 and a Scotland v England match in 1878. Queen's Park left this site in 1883 because of a proposal to extend the Cathcart District Railway line through the site.

Queen's Park then moved to a second Hampden Park, which hosted internationals between 1885 and 1890. The first match hosted outside Glasgow was at Hibernian Park in Edinburgh on 10 March 1888. This started a trend of smaller venues outside Glasgow being used for some of the less attractive fixtures, particularly against Wales. The more attractive match against rivals England was always played in Glasgow, which had the largest stadiums. During the 1890s and early 1900s most of the Scotland fixtures were played either at Celtic Park or Ibrox Park, as Rangers and Celtic competed to host the lucrative match against England. The present site of Ibrox Park was opened in 1899 and it hosted a Scotland match for the first time in 1902, but a collapse in the wooden terracing resulted in the first Ibrox disaster, during which 25 fatalities and nearly 600 injuries were suffered.

The loss of Scotland games to the other venues in Glasgow forced Queen's Park to consider increasing the capacity of the second Hampden. In the late 1890s, Queen's Park requested more land for development, but this was refused by the landlords. The club acquired a new site, the present site of Hampden Park, from Henry Erskine Gordon in 1899. The third Hampden opened in October 1903, while the second Hampden was taken over by Third Lanark and renamed Cathkin Park. The third Hampden hosted its first international in 1906. It expanded to the point where it set world record attendances between the 1900s and 1930s. Even as late as 1970, Hampden set a record attendance for a UEFA competition match, the 1969–70 European Cup semi-final second leg between Celtic and Leeds United.

Modern developments
Hampden continued to be the main home stadium for the Scotland national team until the early 1990s. It then required significant redevelopment to become an all-seater stadium, meeting the requirements of the Taylor Report. Ibrox Park and Pittodrie Stadium in Aberdeen had both been largely redeveloped before then and hosted some of the 1994 FIFA World Cup qualification matches.

Hampden re-opened in 1994 and was used for the UEFA Euro 1996 qualifying matches. It then had to be closed again as the main (south) stand was replaced and a variety of venues were used for 1998 FIFA World Cup qualification and UEFA Euro 2000 qualifying matches, including Ibrox, Pittodrie, Celtic Park, Rugby Park in Kilmarnock and Tynecastle in Edinburgh. The fully redeveloped Hampden was re-opened in 1999 and hosted the later Euro 2000 qualifiers, including the first leg of the play-off against England. Hampden has hosted the clear majority of Scotland matches since 1999 and almost all competitive games. Some friendlies have been moved to smaller venues outside Glasgow, usually either Pittodrie or Easter Road in Edinburgh. Hampden was closed for a year due to its use as an athletics stadium in the 2014 Commonwealth Games.

The lease that the SFA held on Hampden was due to expire in 2020, and this led to Celtic (Celtic Park), Rangers (Ibrox) and the Scottish Rugby Union (Murrayfield) making offers to become the regular home of the Scotland team. In September 2018, the SFA instead announced an agreement to purchase Hampden from Queen's Park. This deal was completed in August 2020. A year later, Hampden also became the regular home venue for the Scotland women's national team.

List of stadiums used for home games

Notes

See also
List of football stadiums in Scotland
List of Scottish Football League stadiums
List of Scottish Premier League stadiums
List of Scottish Professional Football League stadiums
Scottish football attendance records
 Scottish stadium moves

References

External links
Scotland Home Record by Venue, www.londonhearts.com

Stadium
Scotland
International
Football stadiums in Scotland
Association football in Scotland lists